The North Central Regional Transit District operates a network of several local and intercity bus routes in northern New Mexico, serving Santa Fe, Española, Taos, and many smaller communities along a network of 25 fixed routes and one demand-response route, one dial-a-ride and complementary Paratransit service in the Taos area. Routes operate Monday through Friday only, with the exceptions of the "Taos Express," which operates only on weekends, the Mountain Trail route to the Santa Fe National Forest and Ski Santa Fe, which operates daily, and seasonal daily service from the Town of Taos to Taos Ski Valley. All routes are fare-free, with the exception of the Taos Express and Mountain Trail route which are premium fare-based routes. The service is supported primarily by transit gross receipt taxes, which provides approximately 70% of the RTD's revenues.

History 
The North Central RTD was created in September 2004 by the New Mexico Transportation Commission under the Regional Transit Act, a law passed by Governor Bill Richardson that authorized the creation of Regional Transit Districts in New Mexico. The RTD first began public transit operations in 2007 after consolidating with local transit services in Rio Arriba County and the City of Española. In the following years, NCRTD expanded service further, aided by a gross receipts tax of one-eighth of one percent that was approved by voters in 2008.

In January 2015, NCRTD took over operations of the weekend Taos Express bus service, and in July took over operations of the local Chile Line bus service in the town of Taos. In September 2015, the RTD opened a new route serving the Santa Fe Ski Area. And in March 2016, the RTD began service along a new route between Santa Fe and La Cienega.

In partnership with the Jicarilla Apache Nation, the District launched the 170 Jicarilla Route in October 2017. The route provides service between Chama, Dulce and Farmington, NM.

Current members of the district include Los Alamos County, Rio Arriba County, Santa Fe County and Taos County, as well as several pueblos, including Ohkay Owingeh, Pojoaque, Nambe, San Ildefonso, Santa Clara and Tesuque.; and the Cities of Española and Santa Fe, the Town of Taos and Edgewood and the Village of Chama. The Rio Metro RTD, based in Albuquerque, sits on the Board as an ex-officio member.

Blue Bus Tracker 
In March 2015, NCRTD launched the Blue Bus Tracker, which allows riders to view bus routes and stops, as well as to view service alerts and expected departure times based on real-time GPS data. Each bus stop on the network is identified by a unique number, which is displayed at the stop; by inputting the number into the Blue Bus Tracker or by texting the number to an automated service number, real-time information can be viewed for that stop.

Recognition 
In October 2014, NCRTD was one of five rural transit agencies nationwide recognized by the Federal Transit Administration with the "Administrator’s Award for Outstanding Public Transportation Service in Rural Public Transportation." NCRTD was also honored by the New Mexico Department of Transportation as the "2014 Section 5311 Rural Transit System of the Year," and was honored in both 2009 and 2012 as the "Job Access and Reverse Commute Transportation System of the Year."

Expansion 
In partnership with the Jicarilla Apache Nation, the District launched the 170 Jicarilla Route in October 2017. The route provides service between Chama and Dulce Monday, Wednesday and Friday, and Chama, Dulce and Farmington, NM Tuesday and Thursday. On 28 September 2015, the new Mountain Trail route opened, providing service between the city of Santa Fe and the Santa Fe Ski Area. Unlike most other NCRTD routes, there is a $5 fare to ride each-way in winter and one-way outside of the ski season, although this is compensated for with discounts for lift tickets at the ski area, during season. Multiple stops are made at trailheads and various locations in the Santa Fe National Forest.

List of routes 
100 Riverside: Riverside Drive, Española
110 Westside-Crosstown: Fairview Lane, Española
150 Chimayo: Las Trampas – Chimayo – Española
160 Santa Clara: Santa Fe/Ohkay Owingeh – Española – Santa Clara Pueblo
170 Jicarilla: Service between Chama, Dulce and Farmington, and the Jicarilla Apache Nation
180 El Rito: El Rito – Ojo Caliente – Española
190 Chama: Chama – Española via U.S. Route 84
200 Santa Fe: Española-Pojoaque – Santa Fe
210 Pojoaque-Nambe Dial-A-Ride220 Tesuque: Española-Tesuque – Santa Fe230 San Ildefonso: San Ildefonso Pueblo – Pojoaque255 Mountain Trail: Santa Fe – Santa Fe Ski Area260 La Cienega: La Cienega – Santa Fe270 Turquoise Trail: Santa Fe – Madrid – Golden via New Mexico State Road 14280 Eldorado: Edgewood – Eldorado – Santa Fe290 Edgewood: Edgewood – Eldorado – Santa Fe300 Taos: Taos – Española via New Mexico State Road 68305 Taos Express:Weekend express service between Taos, Española and Santa Fe310 Red River: Red River – Questa320 Questa: Taos – Questa – Costilla via New Mexico State Road 522330 Peñasco: Taos – Peñasco – Las Trampas340 Chile Line Red: Town of Taos341 TSV Green: Town of Taos to Taos Ski Valley360 Tres Piedras: Taos – Tres Piedras via the Rio Grande Gorge Bridge400 Los Alamos:''' Los Alamos – Española/Pojoaque

Other RTD funded services 
The North Central RTD also funds two local bus networks in the area. In Santa Fe, the RTD provides funding to Santa Fe Trails, which provides service on ten fixed routes, two downtown circulator routes (the Santa Fe Pickup) and a paratransit service that provides demand-response transportation for elderly and disabled persons (the Santa Fe Ride). In Los Alamos and White Rock, the RTD also provides funding to Atomic City Transit, which provides service on seven fixed routes, five school bus routes, and a Dial-A-Ride system. The RTD also provides funding to the New Mexico Rail Runner Express which offers rail service between the cities of Albuquerque and Santa Fe.

References

External links 
 Official North Central RTD (NCRTD) website

Bus transportation in New Mexico
Transit agencies in the United States
Transportation in Los Alamos County, New Mexico
Transportation in Rio Arriba County, New Mexico
Transportation in Santa Fe County, New Mexico
Transportation in Taos County, New Mexico
Transportation in Torrance County, New Mexico
Española, New Mexico
Santa Fe, New Mexico
Taos, New Mexico
2007 establishments in New Mexico